La Generala may refer to:

Maria Teresinha Gomes, Portuguese military general
María Antonieta Rodríguez Mata, Mexican police officer and drug lord